Canaan Township is one of the sixteen townships of Morrow County, Ohio, United States.  The 2010 census found 963 people in the township.

Geography
Located in the northwestern part of the county, it borders the following townships:
Tully Township, Marion County - north
Washington Township - northeast
Gilead Township - southeast
Cardington Township - south
Richland Township, Marion County - southwest corner
Claridon Township, Marion County - west
Scott Township, Marion County - northwest corner

No municipalities are located in Canaan Township.

Name and history
Canaan Township was organized in 1817. The name alludes to the biblical Canaan. Statewide, other Canaan Townships are located in Athens, Madison, and Wayne counties.

Government
The township is governed by a three-member board of trustees, who are elected in November of odd-numbered years to a four-year term beginning on the following January 1. Two are elected in the year after the presidential election and one is elected in the year before it. There is also an elected township fiscal officer, who serves a four-year term beginning on April 1 of the year after the election, which is held in November of the year before the presidential election. Vacancies in the fiscal officership or on the board of trustees are filled by the remaining trustees.

References

External links
County website

Townships in Morrow County, Ohio
1817 establishments in Ohio
Populated places established in 1817
Townships in Ohio